The Unicode usage character block or characters block may refer to:
Ideographic Description Characters (Unicode block)
Specials (Unicode block)